Faysal Ben Ahmed (born 7 March 1973) is a Tunisian footballer who played as a defender or defensive midfielder, spending most of his career at hometown club AS Ariana and Espérance.

Ben Ahmed was in the Tunisia national football team for the 1998 FIFA World Cup and appeared as a substitute against Colombia.

External links

1973 births
Living people
Tunisian footballers
1998 FIFA World Cup players
Tunisia international footballers
Place of birth missing (living people)
Association football defenders
AS Ariana players
Espérance Sportive de Tunis players
AS Djerba players
CO Transports players